Orconectes is a genus of cave dwelling freshwater crayfish, endemic to suitable habitats in the eastern United States. Surface dwelling species, formerly categorised here, were moved to Faxonius in 2017.

Due to their subterranean habitat, they are usually depigmented, often blind, and are long-lived. Ages of 176 years have been claimed for O. australis, though this was reduced to ≤22 years in a 2012 study.

Taxonomy 
The genus Orconectes was erected in 1872 by Edward Drinker Cope to house Astacus pellucidus (now Orconectes pellucidus) and his new species, Orconectes inermis.

Prior to the 2017 review by Oxford university, the genus contained 85 species in 11 subgenera. The Faxonius subgenus was raised to a full genus, and the majority of species formerly recorded as Orconectes were moved there. Following the review, approximately 8 species are known:

References

External links 

Cambaridae
Cave crayfish
Fauna of the Eastern United States
Freshwater crustaceans of North America
Crustacean genera
Taxa named by Edward Drinker Cope